Sakarcaören is a village in the Orta District of Çankırı Province in Turkey. Its population is 116 (2021).

References

Villages in Orta District